Tobias Barnerssoi (born 19 June 1969 in Eichstätt) is a retired German alpine skier who competed in the 1994 Winter Olympics.

References

External links
 

1969 births
Living people
German male alpine skiers
Olympic alpine skiers of Germany
Alpine skiers at the 1994 Winter Olympics
People from Eichstätt
Sportspeople from Upper Bavaria
20th-century German people